Richard Friedman may refer to:
Richard L. Friedman (born 1940), businessman and real estate developer
Richard C. Friedman (1941–2020) medical doctor who conducted research on the psychodynamics of male homosexuality
Kinky Friedman (born 1944), Richard S. Friedman, songwriter and novelist
Richard Elliott Friedman (born 1946), biblical scholar
Richard A. Friedman (born 1950s), American psychiatrist

See also
Richard Freeman (disambiguation) 
Richard Feynman American theoretical physicist and Nobel Laureate